Calvin Richard Daniels (born December 26, 1958) is a former American football linebacker in the National Football League for the Kansas City Chiefs and the Washington Redskins.  He played college football at the University of North Carolina and was drafted in the second round of the 1982 NFL Draft.

References

1958 births
Living people
People from Morehead City, North Carolina
American football linebackers
North Carolina Tar Heels football players
Kansas City Chiefs players
Washington Redskins players